Alfred Schreuder (born 2 November 1972) is a Dutch football coach and former player who last coached Ajax.

Club career
During his career, Schreuder played for RKC Waalwijk, NAC Breda, Feyenoord, FC Twente and Vitesse. After he had stopped playing for FC Twente in March 2008, he joined SDV Barneveld on an amateur basis. After about three months, he returned as professional football player, signing a contract for one year at Vitesse. He retired in January 2009.

Managerial career
Schreuder started his managerial career immediately after his retirement as assistant manager of Vitesse. In the summer of 2009, he signed with FC Twente to be the assistant manager of Steve McClaren. After McClaren resigned his position on 26 February 2013, Schreuder was appointed as interim manager. However, in March 2013, the club officially appointed Michel Jansen as head coach and Schreuder as his assistant, because Schreuder was not yet appropriately licensed as a manager. This arrangement continued for the 2013–14 season, while Schreuder was studying for the UEFA Pro Licence, which he obtained in May 2014. Subsequently, Schreuder was installed as manager of FC Twente, with Jansen as his assistant. On 30 August 2015, Schreuder was sacked after winning one point in the first four matches of the 2015–16 season.

On 26 October 2015, Schreuder was appointed the assistant manager of Huub Stevens at TSG 1899 Hoffenheim. After Stevens' resignation on 10 February 2016, he remained at the club as the assistant of Julian Nagelsmann.

On 5 January 2018, it was announced that Ajax had reached an agreement with Hoffenheim to sign Schreuder as the assistant of their new head coach Erik ten Hag.

In March 2019, it was announced that Schreuder would succeed Julian Nagelsmann as head of TSG 1899 Hoffenheim from 1 July 2019, after signing a contract until 2022. However he was sacked by the club on 9 June 2020, since his form was not up to the expectations of the board.

In August 2020, Schreuder joined FC Barcelona as assistant manager under Ronald Koeman, both signing a two-year deal with an escape-clause option after the first year.

On 3 January 2022, Schreuder was appointed as head coach of Club Brugge, replacing Philippe Clement who left to manage Monaco. After winning the Belgian League, he was appointed by Ajax on a two-year contract from the 2022–23 season onwards, replacing Erik ten Hag who left to manage Manchester United. On 26 January 2023, he was sacked from his position at Ajax due to poor results.

Personal life
His brother Dick was also a footballer and joined him in coaching at Hoffenheim.

Career statistics

Managerial statistics

Honours

Player
NAC Breda
 Eerste Divisie: 1999–2000

Feyenoord
 Eredivisie: 1992–93
 KNVB Cup: 1991–92
 Johan Cruyff Shield: 1991

Managerial
Club Brugge
 Belgian First Division A: 2021–22

References

External links

1972 births
Living people
People from Barneveld
Footballers from Gelderland
Dutch footballers
Feyenoord players
RKC Waalwijk players
NAC Breda players
FC Twente players
SBV Vitesse players
Eredivisie players
Eerste Divisie players
Dutch football managers
FC Twente managers
Eredivisie managers
TSG 1899 Hoffenheim managers
Bundesliga managers
Club Brugge KV head coaches
Belgian Pro League managers
AFC Ajax non-playing staff
AFC Ajax managers
Dutch expatriate sportspeople in Germany
Dutch expatriate sportspeople in Spain
Dutch expatriate sportspeople in Belgium
Association football midfielders
Expatriate football managers in Germany
Expatriate football managers in Belgium
Dutch expatriate football managers
FC Twente non-playing staff
FC Barcelona non-playing staff
SBV Vitesse non-playing staff
TSG 1899 Hoffenheim non-playing staff